The 2021–22 season was the 95th season in the existence of ACF Fiorentina and the club's 18th consecutive season in the top flight of Italian football. In addition to the domestic league, Fiorentina participated in this season's edition of the Coppa Italia.

Following last season's disappointment results, Giuseppe Iachini was let go at the end of the season. Gennaro Gattuso was initially hired to be the team's manager in the early summer, but parted ways 23 days after his appointment following disagreements on transfer policy and agent's influence. Vincenzo Italiano was hired from Spezia as the team's next manager.

Players

Squad information

Appearances include league matches only

Other players under contract

Out on loan

Transfers

In

Loans in

Out

Pre-season and friendlies

Competitions

Overall record

Serie A

League table

Results summary

Results by round

Matches
The league fixtures were announced on 14 July 2021.

Coppa Italia

Statistics

Appearances and goals

|-
! colspan=14 style="background:#9400D3; color:#FFFFFF; text-align:center"| Goalkeepers

|-
! colspan=14 style="background:#9400D3; color:#FFFFFF; text-align:center"| Defenders

|-
! colspan=14 style="background:#9400D3; color:#FFFFFF; text-align:center"| Midfielders

|-
! colspan=14 style="background:#9400D3; color:#FFFFFF; text-align:center"| Forwards

|-
! colspan=14 style="background:#9400D3; color:#FFFFFF; text-align:center"| Players transferred out during the season

References

ACF Fiorentina seasons
Fiorentina